Carl F. Nathan is the chair of the department of microbiology and immunology at Weill Cornell Medicine and dean of the Weill Graduate School of Medical Sciences at Cornell University. Some of his most notable work has been in the characterization of IFNγ, TGF-β, and TNFα in immunology. The Nathan lab studies the immune response to M. tuberculosis.

Career 
Nathan graduated from Harvard College in 1967, and Harvard Medical School in 1972. After an internal medicine residency, he did a fellowship in oncology. He was a professor at the Rockefeller University from 1977–1986, before moving to Cornell. He has been the chair of the department of microbiology and immunology since 1998.  His lab is in the Belfer Research Building.

Nathan was involved in the discovery of the roles of IFNγ, TGF-β, and TNFα in macrophages.

Nathan was elected to the American Society for Clinical Investigation in 1983 and the National Academy of Medicine in 1998.
He was elected to the National Academy of Sciences in 2011. He received the Robert Koch Prize in 2009 and the Anthony Cerami Award in Translational Medicine in 2013.

References 

Members of the United States National Academy of Sciences
Members of the National Academy of Medicine
Harvard University alumni
Harvard Medical School alumni
Cornell University faculty
Living people
Year of birth missing (living people)